Rayong province is one of seventy-six provinces (changwat) lies in eastern Thailand. Neighboring provinces are (from west clockwise) Chonburi, and Chanthaburi. To the south is the Gulf of Thailand.

, per capita earnings were higher in Rayong province than in any other Thai province.

History
Rayong began to appear in 1570 in the reign of Maha Thammaracha, The Khmer Ruler has invaded Siam in the eastern coastal city but unable to seize the city.

King Taksin (of Thailand) came to Rayong after the fall of Ayutthaya. During a short stay in Rayong he built a navy, and then went on to Chanthaburi to assemble forces to fight the Burmese. There is a shrine in Rayong where local people pay their respects to Taksin.

In 1906, Rayong was merged to Monthon Chanthaburi. In 1908, Klaeng district was merged to Rayong.

In the reign of King Rama VI, changed the name of "Rayong City" to "Rayong province" in 1916 but it still part of Monthon Chanthaburi. Later in 1931, Monthon Chanthaburi was dissolved and Rayong was merged to Monthon Prachinburi.

Geography

Although the north is hilly, the province consists mostly of low coastal plains. Off the shoreline of Mueang Rayong District is Khao Laem Ya–Mu Ko Samet National Park, consisting of several islands.

National parks
There are two national parks, along with five other national parks, make up region 2 (Si Racha) of Thailand's protected areas.
 Khao Laem Ya–Mu Ko Samet National Park, 
 Khao Chamao–Khao Wong National Park,

Symbols
The seal of the province shows the island Ko Samet. The provincial tree is the Alexandrian laurel (Calophyllum inophyllum).

Economy
Rayong is one of the three Thai provinces, together with Chonburi and Chachoengsao, at the center of the nation's Eastern Economic Corridor. The three provinces are to become Thailand's hub for manufacturing, research, and services tightly coupled with its ASEAN neighbors and the world logistically. The project is the centerpiece of the government's "Thailand 4.0" economic initiative.

Administrative divisions

Provincial government
The province is divided into eight districts (amphoes). These are further divided into 58 subdistricts (tambons) and 388 villages (mubans).

Local government
As of 21 November 2019 there are: one Rayong Provincial Administrative Organization - PAO and 30 municipal (thesaban) areas in the province. The capital Rayong has city (thesaban nakhon) status. Ban Chang and Map Ta Phut have town (thesaban mueang) status and 27 subdistrict  municipalities (thesaban tambon). The non-municipal areas are administered by 37 Subdistrict Administrative Organizations - SAO (ongkan borihan suan tambon).

Health 
Rayong's main hospital is Rayong Hospital, operated by the Ministry of Public Health.

Human achievement index 2017

Since 2003, United Nations Development Programme (UNDP) in Thailand has tracked progress on human development at sub-national level using the Human achievement index (HAI), a composite index covering all the eight key areas of human development. National Economic and Social Development Board (NESDB) has taken over this task since 2017.

Notable People from Rayong province
 Stamp Fairtex, Thai Muay Thai kickboxer and mixed martial artist (ONE Championship)

Gallery

References

External links

Provincial Website (Thai)
 Eastern Economic Corridor (EEC) Office

 
Provinces of Thailand
Gulf of Thailand